Fons memorabilium universi ("Source of notable information about the universe") is an early encyclopedia, written in Latin by the Italian humanist Domenico Bandini of Arezzo (also given as Domenico di Bandino or Dominicus Bandinus, c. 1335 – 1418).
Planned to inform and edify educated men who lack other books, the work covered God and the natural world, as was common for encyclopedias of the time, but also added a voluminous last part dealing with man and historical figures, philosophy and history, theology, ethics, heretics and women.

Bandini, a teacher of grammar and rhetoric who lived in Florence, Bologna, Città di Castello and Arezzo, worked on the encyclopedia from before 1374 until his death in 1418. In Florence he was influenced by Coluccio Salutati, causing him to emphasize topics related to the classical antiquity in his work. Bandini's son Laurentius completed and published the work after Bandini's death and added an introductory apology, defending the work against criticism of style.

At least 26 manuscripts survive, including one at Balliol College, of which digital photographs are available online, and two at the Vatican Library. Many of these contain only parts of the work. They all date from before 1460.
The whole work consists of between two and five volumes, depending on writing style and size.

The work was not very influential and was already almost forgotten in the 15th century. It was never printed, unlike the very successful 13th century encyclopedia De proprietatibus rerum by Bartholomeus Anglicus, from which Bandini had borrowed heavily. He also frequently cited the earlier works of Marcus Terentius Varro, Pliny the Elder, Gaius Julius Solinus, Isidore of Seville and Hrabanus Maurus.

The end of book 8 "on the planets" contains an unrelated interpolation praising two lawyers from Bologna. The paragraph has been interpreted as an advertisement inserted by the lawyers, either by having paid the scribes or by having worked as scribes themselves.

Organization
The work is organized in 5 parts (to reflect the five wounds of Christ), with each part divided into several books containing numerous cross references. Each of the 34 books covers one circle of topics. Some of these books consist of several introductory and systematical chapters, followed by an alphabetically ordered list of articles. This organization had been developed in the 13th century by Vincent of Beauvais in his Speculum naturale and had also been used by Bartholomaus Anglicus in his De proprietatibus rerum and by Thomas of Cantimpré in his Liber de natura rerum.

The titles of the books are:
 Part I
1. De deo
2. De angelis
3. De anima
4. De inferno
 Part II
5. De mundo
6. De celo et signis celestibus
7. De stellis fixis
8. De planetis
9. De tempore
 Part III
10. De elementis in generali
11. De elemento ignis
12. De elemento aeris
13. De impressionibus aeris
14. De ornatu aeris (de avibus)
15. De aquis salsis
16. De aquis dulcibus
17. De piscibus
 Part IV
18. De provinciis
19. De insulis
20. De civitatibus
21. De aedificiis
22. De populis
23. De montibus
24. De arboribus
25. De herbis
26. De quadrupedibus
27. De reptilibus, serpentibus et vermibus
28. De lapidibus et gemmis
29. De metallis
 Part V
30. De viris claris
31. De sectis philosophorum
32. De virtutibus theologicis et moralibus
33. De sectis haereticorum
34. De mulieribus claris

References

External links
 Digital images of Oxford Balliol College MS 238A-E, 5 volume 15th century manuscript copy of Fons memorabilium uniuersi at Balliol College. The first book of Part V is missing.

Latin encyclopedias
Italian encyclopedias
Medieval European encyclopedias
15th-century Latin books